Yubraj Nayaghare is writer, litterateur and winner of Madan Puraskar of Nepal.

Books 
 Anaam Pahadma PhanPhani
 Ghamko Chumban (2012)
 Ek Haatko Taali (2009) - won the Madan Puraskar award

References

Nepali-language writers
Living people
Madan Puraskar winners
21st-century Nepalese male writers
1969 births